Sami (also spelt Sami) is a town located in Mindat District, Chin State of Myanmar (Burma). It is the administrative seat of Sami sub-township.

References 

Populated places in Chin State